{{Infobox amusement park
| name            = Parque Warner Madrid
| image           = 
| caption         = Parque Warner Madrid main entrance
| resort          =
| location        = San Martín de la Vega
| location2       = Madrid
| location3       = Spain
| coordinates     = 
| theme           = Warner Brothers entertainment & show business & movie studio & Hollywood & Warner Bros.
| homepage        = 
| owner           = Parques Reunidos (95%)Warner Bros. Discovery (5%)
| general_manager =
| operator        = Parques Reunidos
| opening_date    = 
| closing_date    =
| previous_names  = Warner Bros. Movie World Madrid  (2002–2006)Warner Bros Park Madrid <span style="white-space: nowrap"> (2002–2006)
| season          =
| visitors        =
| area            =
| rides           = 42
| coasters        = 6
| water_rides     =
| slogan          =
| footnotes       =
}}

The park opened as Warner Bros. Movie World Madrid/Warner Bros. Park Madrid on 6 April 2002 and was owned by numerous Spanish investment groups, with Six Flags operating the park as part of the deal. In November 2004, the management arrangement with Six Flags was terminated, with the name change to Parque Warner Madrid occurring at the start of 2006.

The park is currently owned and operated by Parques Reunidos, with a 5% ownership share held by Warner Bros. Discovery Global Brands and Experiences.

History

The park was originally built and operated as Warner Bros. Movie World Madrid, alternatively known as Warner Bros. Park Madrid. The park was built as part of a joint-venture of various shareholders, with the Community of Madrid, holding the highest of 40% and Caja Madrid holding the second highest at 20%. Other minor shareholders were Fadesa (15%), El Corte Inglés (5%), NH Hotels (5%), Six Flags (5%) and construction companies Dragados, ACS, Ferrovial, Necso and FCC (each with 2%). Six Flags also operated the park for the shareholders.

The park held its grand opening on 5 April 2002 with 10,000 invited guests including Bo Derek and Christopher Lambert as special guests. The park was opened to the general public on 6 April 2002.

In 2002, director Pilar Azcárraga said that visitors' satisfaction level was around 90%, but union sources put it at 50%. 

On 3 April 2004, Six Flags sold all of its European parks, including sister park Warner Bros. Movie World Germany, to StarParks, a subsidiary of Palamon Capital Partners. Warner Bros. Movie World Madrid was not included in the sale though, and on November 23, 2004, it was announced that Six Flags' 99-year contract to operate the park was terminated, allowing the park's management to operate the park from then-on, and continuing to allow the use to use Warner Bros. properties. Six Flags' stake in the park was transitioned off to Warner Bros. Entertainment itself.

In 2006, the park was renamed as "Parque Warner Madrid". This season saw the premiere of two new shows, Police Academy 2 and Batman Begins, the latter based on the latest movie from Warner Brothers and DC Comics. Both received good reviews from visitors to the park. In November 2006, the Community of Madrid sold their stake in the park to Fadesa, who by then had held 73% shares in the park. After the sale, Parques Reunidos were announced by Fadesa to operate the park as part of a ten-year agreement. In February 2007, Fadesa announced an agreement that would allow Parques Reunidos to purchase the park within a two-three year span. Following the bankruptcy of Fadesa, Parques Reunidos fully purchased out all the shareholders of the park to fully own and operate the park, with Warner Bros. retaining its 5% stake.

The 2008 season saw two further developments: a water attraction called Oso Yogui and a new show, The Music of Bugs Bunny, based around the glamor of Hollywood in a performance reminiscent of the great Broadway musicals. Following the new ownership, the park gave its first yearly profit after operating on a loss over the past few years.

In June 2014, a water park, Parque Warner Beach, was opened. The €8.5 million park spans  and features two wave pools, a lazy river and two water play areas. Like parts of the original theme park, Parque Warner Beach is themed around Looney Tunes, Hanna Barbera and DC Comics characters.

Attractions

Among its roller coasters, highlights include Superman: La Atracción de Acero, a first in Europe with its floorless trains, Batman: Arkham Asylum, an inverted roller coaster, Coaster-Express, a wooden coaster and Stunt Fall, a giant inverted boomerang offering guests a vertical drop of 54.4 m reaching a top speed of 115 km/h. Another prominent attraction is La Venganza del Enigma, a structure 100 meters high that drops visitors at 80 km/h.

Other attractions at the park include Correcaminos Bip, Bip, a Wile E. Coyote and the Road Runner coaster which delivers high speeds and drops (though it has no inversions) and La Aventura de Scooby-Doo'', an interactive ride for families, manufactured by US firm Sally Corporation.

The park is divided into five themed areas: DC Super Heroes World, Hollywood Boulevard, Movie World Studios, Old West Territory and Cartoon Village.

List of attractions

See also 
 Warner Bros. World Abu Dhabi
 Warner Bros. Movie World
 Movie Park Germany
 Hopi Hari

References

External links

 Official website
 Parque Warner Madrid on Google Maps
 

 
Amusement parks in Spain
2002 establishments in Spain
Parques Reunidos
Buildings and structures in the Community of Madrid
Tourist attractions in the Community of Madrid
Amusement parks opened in 2002
Warner Bros. Global Brands and Experiences
WarnerMedia subsidiaries